Talks with TGM (Czech Hovory s TGM) is a 2018 Czech historical film by Jakub Červenka. It premiered 100 years after foundation of Czechoslovakia. It is based on a book of the same name by Karel Čapek. It focuses on the first Czechoslovak president Tomáš Garrigue Masaryk and writer Karel Čapek and their dialogue in 1928.

Plot
The film is set in the fall of 1928 during Karel Čapek's meeting with Tomáš Garrigue Masaryk.

Cast
 Martin Huba as Tomáš Garrigue Masaryk
 Jan Budař as Karel Čapek
 Lucia Siposová
 Roman Luknár

References

External links
 

2018 films
Czech historical thriller films
2010s Czech-language films
2010s historical thriller films
Films set in the 1920s
Czech Film Critics' Awards winners
Adaptations of works by Karel Čapek